Ludwig Persson (born 8 October 2003) is a Swedish ice hockey left wing playing for Frölunda HC of the Swedish Hockey League (SHL). Persson was drafted 85th overall, in the third round, by the Washington Capitals in the 2022 NHL Entry Draft

References

External links
 

2003 births
Living people
Frölunda HC players
Ice hockey people from Gothenburg
Swedish ice hockey left wingers
Washington Capitals draft picks
21st-century Swedish people